Feadillo is a genus of woodlice in the family Armadillidae. It was first described in 1983 by Helmut Schmalfuss and Franco Ferrara. The name refers to the Italian zoologist Leonardo Fea.

The genus comprises the following species:

References

Woodlice